Gabrielle Dennis is an American actress and comedian, known mostly for her work in cable television series (The Game, Blue Mountain State, The Underground). Dennis starred in the Fox medical drama Rosewood alongside Morris Chestnut. In 2018, she began starring as Tilda Johnson in the Marvel Comics-based series Luke Cage (2018).

Career 
Dennis has a background in dance, theatre, stand-up comedy, and singing.

In 2008, Dennis won the role of Janay Brice on The CW comedy series The Game. After the show was canceled, fans campaigned for its return where Dennis was able to reprise her role for two more seasons on BET. During her stint on The Game she landed roles in the direct-to-DVD film Bring It On: Fight to the Finish, and The Marc Pease Experience. She played Denise Roy on Spike's Blue Mountain State.

Dennis has since guest-starred on several series including Franklin & Bash, Bones, Justified, and Baby Daddy. In 2015, she landed the role of Pippy Rosewood, the toxicology expert and lesbian sister of Beaumont Rosewood (Chestnut) for Fox's Rosewood.

Dennis is in a recurring role as Candace on the hit show Insecure.

Dennis played Whitney Houston in the BET miniseries, The Bobby Brown Story, which debuted in the United States and internationally in September 2018.

Since 2019, Dennis has starred in the hit sketch comedy HBO show A Black Lady Sketch Show.

Filmography

Film

Television

References

External links 
 
 

Living people
African-American actresses
American film actresses
American television actresses
20th-century American actresses
21st-century American actresses
20th-century African-American women
20th-century African-American people
21st-century African-American women
21st-century African-American people
Year of birth missing (living people)